The 2nd Dragoons or 2nd Dragoon Regiment may refer to:
 2nd Dragoons, a British regiment usually known as the Royal Scots Greys
 2nd Dragoons (Canada), a Canadian regiment that amalgamated into the 2nd/10th Dragoons
 2nd Dragoon Regiment (Denmark)
 2nd Dragoon Regiment (France)
 2nd Cavalry Regiment (United States), also known as the 2nd Dragoons

See also 
2nd Dragoon Guards (Queen's Bays)
2nd Regiment (disambiguation)